McCutchenville is a census-designated place (CDP) in northern Tymochtee Township, Wyandot County, Ohio, United States.  It has a post office with the ZIP code 44844.  It lies at the intersection of State Routes 53 and 587.

Demographics

History
McCutchenville was laid out in 1829. The community was named for Joseph McCutchen, the original owner of the town site. A post office has been in operation at McCutchenville since 1833. In 1829, Joseph McCuthchen built the McCutchen Overland Inn. The Inn served as a stagecoach stop on the Harrison Trail. Later, the Inn became a hotel and apartment building, before falling into disrepair. The structure that formerly housed the Inn was purchased by the Wyandot County Historical Society in 1964. Over the course of three years, the building was restored to its stagecoach days, and was soon dedicated as a stagecoach museum. It is one of only two original stagecoach inns remaining in the state.

References

Census-designated places in Ohio
Census-designated places in Wyandot County, Ohio
1829 establishments in Ohio